The European Party of Ukraine is a Ukrainian political party registered by the Ministry of Justice on August 3, 2006. Its ideology is  social-liberalism, when  the state should maintain harmonious social relations:  create appropriate conditions for free competition, to prevent the formation of market monopolies and protect the vulnerable population strata. They advocate reforms that they claim will increase social standards of life of Ukrainians to the  European level. They support integration of Ukraine into the European Union. Initially, the party was headed by Mykola Moskalenko. In August 2013 the party had more than 5,000 members. The party did not take part in national elections since 2012.

History of the Party

Foundation
The date of registration of the European Party of Ukraine by the Ministry of Justice  is August 3, 2006. The first party leader was Mykola Moskalenko, and Victor Zavalnyy was his deputy. Since September 2007 Mykola Katerynchuk has been the leader of the party.

Elections 2007
The European Party joined the single "megablock" of national democratic parties  "Our Ukraine–People's Self-Defense Bloc" in the early 2007 parliamentary elections.
The party's people's deputy  according to the block's list was Mykola Katerynchuk. After polling 14.15% of the votes, the block was the third biggest block and got 72 seats in the Parliament.

Elections 2008
During the 2008 Kyiv local election the party was part of Mykola Katerynchuk Bloc that won 3.47% of the votes and 5 seats in the Kyiv City Council. Mykola Katerynchuk ran for the post Mayor of Kyiv.

Elections 2010
During the presidential elections 2010 the European Party of Ukraine supported Yulia Tymoshenko.

During the 2010 Ukrainian local elections the party won no representatives in Oblast Councils (regional parliaments); its biggest success was winning 1 seat in the city council of Lutsk. According to the results of local elections the European party won 150 local government seats.

Elections 2012
In October 2008 the party intended to run in the October 2012 parliamentary elections (also) as part of a political alliance and was holding negotiations with the Lytvyn Bloc, the Yulia Tymoshenko Bloc and Vitaliy Klychko (in case he would participate in the elections independently) and other political forces. In August 2011 the party announced it would merge with Civil Position. However, Civil Position competed on one single party under the "umbrella" party "Fatherland", together with several other parties, during the 2012 parliamentary elections In these elections (European Party of Ukraine) party leader Katerynchuk won a constituency in Vinnytsia Oblast (and thus was re-elected into parliament) under the same banner. In the same election the party competed in/for 5 constituencies (seats) under its own name (Vinnytsia Oblast, Volyn Oblast, Donetsk Oblast, Ivano-Frankivsk Oblast, Poltava Oblast and Sumy Oblast; the party did not participate in the elections in the national multi-mandate electoral district); but it won in none and thus missed parliamentary representation. When several of the other parties that had competed under "umbrella" "Fatherland" in the 2012 parliamentary elections merged into "Fatherland" in June 2013 the party did not merge with them and kept its independence.

In October 2012 during the parliamentary elections  the European Party of Ukraine proposed its  candidates in single-mandate majority electoral districts in Vinnytsia, Volyn, Donetsk, Ivano-Frankivsk, Poltava and Sumy regions. The European Party of Ukraine  did not participate in the elections in the national multi-mandate electoral district. 
The party leader Mykola Katerynchuk was elected at the majority electoral district  No.13 (Kalinovsky, Khmelnitsky, Kozatinsky districts of Vinnytsia region), he got  64.34% of votes.

Elections 2013
In Horlivka city council in the majority electoral district  No. 21 (the town of the Rumyantseva  mine and a part of the residential district “Sonyachnyy”)  the candidate of the European Party of Ukraine Iryna Korzhukova was elected as a deputy . Receiving 42.8% she outpolled the Party of Regions candidate Vladimir Drukovsky (23.8%) and the Communist Oleg  Afonichkin (11.74%).
The leader of the party began the campaign for mayor of Kyiv, he has significant support of Kyiv citizens   The Kyiv local election date is not yet determined. The Verkhovna Rada (parliament of Ukraine) has not yet set a date for the elections (by law it is obliged to do so).

Elections 2014
The party did not participate in the 2014 Ukrainian parliamentary election. Its leader Katerynchuk was a candidate for Petro Poroshenko Bloc in single-member districts number 13 situated in Kalynivka; but lost this election with 41.29% of the votes to independent candidate Petro Yurchyshyn who gained 44.79%.

Elections 2019
The party supported the candidature of Anatoliy Hrytsenko in the March 2019 Ukrainian presidential election. Party leader Katerynchuk became Hrytsenko's legal advisor in Hrytsenko's election headquarters in December 2018. In these election Hrytsenko did not proceed to the second round of the election; in the first round he placed fifth with 6.91% of the votes.

In the July 2019 Ukrainian parliamentary election the European Party of Ukraine again did not take part. Party leader Mykola Katerynchuk was placed in the top five in the top ten of the party list of Civil Position. But Civil Position gained 1.04% of the national vote and no parliamentary seats.

Party structure

Leader of the Party
The Chairman of the European Party of Ukraine is Mykola Katerynchuk – the people's deputy  of Ukraine of VI, V, VI and VII convocations, the Cand.Sc. Law.  Before he joined the big-league politics, he worked as lawyer. In 2004 he protected the interests of candidate for President of Ukraine Viktor Yushchenko at the Supreme Court of Ukraine.

The governing bodies of the Party
 Party Congress (convened not less than once every two years; it defines the party strategy and chooses its leader).
 Party Council (held every one or two months).
 Party Central Executive Committee (provides organizational, informational, analytical and resource support of the party; provides practical implementation of the party central executive bodies’ decisions, orders and instructions of its leader).
 Party Conferences and Executive Committees at the primary level of the local party organizations. 
February 2012 – the Central Executive Committee was headed by Vitaly Shcherbenko.
In August 2013 the European Party of Ukraine has regional branches in 20 regions of Ukraine, Autonomous Republic of Crimea and Kyiv (Vinnitsa, Volyn, Dnipropetrovsk, Donetsk, Transcarpathian, Zaporizhzhya, Ivano-Frankivsk, Kyiv, Kirovohrad, Luhansk, Lviv, Mykolayiv, Odesa, Poltava, Sumy, Kharkiv, Kherson, Khmelnytsky, Cherkasy, Chernihiv).

The ideology of the Party
The party adheres to the basic principles of social liberalism, according to that the state should intervene into economic processes to fight monopoly and maintain a competitive market environment. The society should have legitimate reasons if the income does not meet the contribution of a person to the common good, to withdraw some of this income through taxes and redistribute it for social needs. Improving the living conditions of the poorest strata of society will contribute to the growth of the internal market and economic growth.

Goals and priorities of the Party
 Integration of Ukraine into Europe as a single territory without internal borders and barriers with free flow of work force and financial resources. 
 Approximation of Ukraine's living standards to European ones by implementing systemic reforms.
 Support of the course of the European Union as an institution founded on fundamental liberal principles of freedom, democracy and rule of law. 
 Environmental protection and use of alternative sources of energy.
 Conducting educational campaigns and legislative initiatives aimed at preventing gender discrimination.
 Organization of educational events for young people to make them aware of the history of creation and the basics of activity of the EU institutions, ideas of the leading liberal ideologues and thinkers, as well as the peculiarities of the European integration of Ukraine.

European vector of activity
 Support to signing of the Association Agreement between Ukraine and the EU.
 Simplification of the visa regime for citizens of Ukraine with the EU.
 Promotion of European integration of Ukraine.
 Adaptation of European experience in different areas of social and political life in Ukraine.

European Youth Movement
The Ukrainian Youth NGO «European Youth Movement» as a youth wing of the European Party of Ukraine was created in 2009. The  European Youth Movement has offices in 19 regions of the country and has a purpose to develop young force of Ukraine for which human rights and freedoms and the democratic European vector of development of Ukraine have the highest priority.

International Cooperation
The European Party of Ukraine in May 2013 became a full member (with voting rights) of the Alliance of Liberals and Democrats for Europe Party – an international union of liberal parties of Europe that includes 50 parties from different countries.

References

External links

CEC results
Gorlivka Europeans won in the local elections before Communists and Regionals
GfK quiz
European Youth Movement
European Youth Movement - blog
Member of European Parliament: Ukraine needs another Orange Revolution

Liberal parties in Ukraine
Political parties established in 2006
Pro-European political parties in Ukraine